Marcello Hernandez (born August 19, 1997) is an American stand-up comedian and actor. Hernandez joined the cast of the NBC sketch comedy series Saturday Night Live as a featured player before the start of the show's 48th season in 2022.

Biography 
Hernandez grew up in Miami, Florida, where he attended Belen Jesuit Preparatory School. He graduated from John Carroll University in 2019 with a degree in Entrepreneurship and Communication. He is of Cuban descent on his mother's side and Dominican descent on his father's side.

He moved to New York City in 2019 to pursue his stand-up career. In 2022, he was selected for Just for Laughs New Face of Comedy.

Hernandez had previously done comedy and performed short-form pieces on social media channels, such as the weekly review show Only in Dade about his home of Miami, Florida on TikTok.

References

External links

Living people
21st-century American male actors
American entertainers of Cuban descent
American male comedians
American male television actors
American sketch comedians
American stand-up comedians
American people of Dominican Republic descent
American TikTokers
Comedians from Florida
John Carroll University alumni
Male actors from Miami
Place of birth missing (living people)
1997 births